is a highway in Japan on the island of Honshū which runs from Fukushima in Fukushima Prefecture to Akita in Akita Prefecture.

Route data
Length: 
Origin: Fukushima (originates at junction with Route 4)
Terminus: Akita (ends at Junction with Route 7)
Major cities: Fukushima, Yonezawa, Yamagata, Akita

History
4 December 1952: First Class National Highway 13 (from Fukushima to Akita)
1 April 1965: General National Highway 13 (from Fukushima to Akita)

Municipalities passed through
Fukushima Prefecture
Fukushima
Yamagata Prefecture
Yonezawa - Takahata - Nan'yō - Kaminoyama - Yamagata - Tendō - Higashine - Murayama - Obanazawa - Ōishida - Funagata - Shinjō - Kaneyama - Mamurogawa
Akita Prefecture
Yuzawa - Yokote - Misato - Daisen - Akita

Major intersections

in Fukushima Prefecture
Routes 4, 115
in Yamagata Prefecture
Routes 47, 48, 112, 113, 121, 286, 287, 344, 347 and 458
in Akita Prefecture
Routes 7, 46, 105, 107, 108, 341, 342, 397 and 398

See also
Tōhoku-Chūō Expressway

References

013
Roads in Akita Prefecture
Roads in Fukushima Prefecture
Roads in Yamagata Prefecture